Margarita Nikolyan (born 27 May 1974) is an Armenian cross-country skier. She competed in four events at the 2002 Winter Olympics.

References

External links
 

1974 births
Living people
Armenian female cross-country skiers
Olympic cross-country skiers of Armenia
Cross-country skiers at the 2002 Winter Olympics
Sportspeople from Gyumri
21st-century Armenian women